Frederik Mortensen may refer to:

 Frederik Søgaard Mortensen (born 1997), Danish badminton player
 Frederik Mortensen (footballer) (born 1998), Danish footballer